See-Saw Films is a British-Australian film and television production company founded in 2008 by Iain Canning and Emile Sherman, with offices in London and Sydney. Their productions include The King's Speech, Top Of The Lake, Lion, The Power of the Dog, Slow Horses and the British teen series Heartstopper.

History
Producers Iain Canning and Emile Sherman co-founded See-Saw Films in 2008.

In 2011, See-Saw won the Academy Award for Best Picture for their film The King's Speech directed by Tom Hooper. The film stars Colin Firth, Geoffrey Rush and Helena Bonham Carter.

See-Saw's first television series was Top Of The Lake, directed by Jane Campion and starring Elisabeth Moss and Holly Hunter. The first series released in 2013 and was nominated for eight Emmy Awards and two Golden Globe Awards. The second series, Top Of The Lake: China Girl, also directed by Campion, premiered at the Cannes Film Festival 2017.  Elisabeth Moss reprises her role as Detective Robin Griffin in Top Of The Lake: China Girl, which also stars Nicole Kidman and Gwendoline Christie.

See-Saw produced Lion, which premiered in 2016 at the Toronto International Film Festival and stars Dev Patel, Nicole Kidman and Rooney Mara. The film was nominated for six Academy Awards, won two BAFTA Awards, and won 12 AACTA Awards.

In 2019, See-Saw produced short-form British comedy series, State of the Union, which premiered on Sundance TV. The first season won three Emmy Awards and stars Rosamund Pike and Chris O'Dowd. In 2021, the series was renewed for a second season and stars Brendan Gleeson and Patricia Clarkson.

In 2021 releases included British TV series The North Water, written and directed by Andrew Haigh, starring Jack O'Connell and Colin Farrell; and Australian TV series Firebite, written by Warwick Thornton and Brendan Fletcher and directed by Thornton, Fletcher and Tony Krawitz. Both series premiered on AMC+ in the United States.

Toward the end of 2021, Netflix released The Power of the Dog, which is See-Saw's second collaboration with Jane Campion. In 2022, the film won two BAFTAs including Best Film, and was nominated for 12 Academy Awards, with Jane Campion going on to win Best Director. The film originally premiered at the 78th Venice International Film Festival and Campion was awarded the Silver Lion for Best Director.

TV released in 2022 include Slow Horses seasons one and two and The Essex Serpent for Apple TV+, and Heartstopper season one for Netflix. See-Saw's films that released in 2022 were Operation Mincemeat and The Stranger. Florian Zeller's The Son premiered at the 79th Venice International Film Festival and will release theatrically in early 2023.

People
Iain Canning and Emile Sherman co-founded the company, and  remain co-managing directors.

Executive producer of television in the UK, Patrick Walters, joined the company in 2014 and was promoted in 2018 to head of TV development in the UK, US and Australia as well as serving as executive producer on selected UK productions.

Simon Gillis is chief operating officer.

Subsidiaries and associated companies
See-Saw has an in-house sales arm, Cross City Films, which handles international sales of its titles in select territories.

Between 2019 and 2020, See-Saw Films launched joint venture production companies I Am That with Lion director Garth Davis, and Picking Scabs with Samantha Strauss, creator and screenwriter of the Fox Showcase/Sky Atlantic television series The End. I Am That's 50-50 partnership with See-Saw develops feature film and TV projects for Davis to direct and produce alongside See-Saw's managing directors, Canning and Sherman, while Picking Scabs develops projects for Strauss to write and produce with See-Saw

Productions

Film

Television

References

External links
 
 Includes interview with Patrick Walters.

Film production companies of Australia
Entertainment companies established in 2008
British companies established in 2008
Australian companies established in 2008
Film production companies of the United Kingdom
Companies based in Sydney
Mass media companies based in London